The 1952 Texas A&M Aggies football team represented Texas A&M University in the 1952 college football season as a member of the Southwest Conference (SWC). The Aggies were led by head coach Raymond George in his second season and finished with a record of three wins, six losses and one tie (3–6–1 overall, 1–4–1 in the SWC).

Schedule

References

Texas AandM
Texas A&M Aggies football seasons
Texas AandM Aggies football